Fernando Express are a German schlager group founded in 1969 as Skippies.

Discography

Albums 
 10/1985 Montego Bay
 03/1987 Wir machen Holiday
 09/1989 Dolce Vita
 10/1990 Sehnsucht nach Sonne
 10/1991 Unter den Sternen des Südens
 11/1992 Das Märchen der weißen Lagune
 03/1994 Alle Sehnsucht dieser Welt
 03/1995 Ihre größten Erfolge
 06/1996 Sei du meine Insel
 03/1998 Die Könige der Tanzpaläste
 09/1999 Wenn Egon tanzt
 09/2000 Sonnentaucher
 02/2002 Südlich der Sehnsucht
 04/2004 Unser Traum darf nicht sterben
 06/2005 Urlaub für die Seele
 03/2007 Tanz auf dem Vulkan
 09/2008 Meer der Zärtlichkeit
 10/2010 Die Könige der Tanzpaläste
 01/2012 Pretty Flamingo
 08/2013 Bella Bellissima
 06/2014 Sommer in der Seele
 01/2017 Das Beste
 09/2017 Träume sind für alle da
 06/2018 Insel des Glücks
 09/2018 Einmal Himmel und zurück
 11/2019 Das schönste Geschenk

Singles 
 05/1984 Sommer, Sonne, Liebe
 05/1985 Montego Bay
 10/1985 Goodbye Love
 ##/1986 Keiner da (Herzliche Grüße von Ibiza)
 03/1987 Wir machen Holiday
 10/1987 Voyage - Voyage
 04/1988 Aloa
 09/1988 Dolce Vita
 05/1989 Fly Away Flamingo
 09/1989 Holiday Lover
 01/1990 Fiesta Americana
 06/1990 Weiße Taube Sehnsucht
 11/1990 Die versunkene Stadt
 04/1991 Sehnsucht nach Samoa
 09/1991 Flüsterndes Herz
 12/1991 Farewell Kontiki
 04/1992 Goodbye Bora Bora
 08/1992 Das Märchen der weißen Lagune
 01/1993 Canzone di Luna D #73
 07/1993 Jambo Jambo
 01/1994 Piano, Piano
 03/1994 Capitano D #96
 06/1994 Copacabana
 07/1994 Alle Sehnsucht dieser Welt
 03/1995 Mit dem Albatros nach Süden
 09/1995 Du bist der Wind in meinen Segeln
 05/1996 Der Tag, an dem die Sonne wiederkam
 10/1996 Sei du meine Insel
 03/1997 Eviva La Samba (promo single only)
 07/1997 Silbervogel (promo single only)
 02/1998 Serenata d'Amore (promo single only)
 06/1998 Feuer und Flamme (promo single only)
 11/1998 Solang' mein Herz noch schlägt (promo single only)
 04/1999 Party-Hit-Mix (promo single only)
 08/1999 Wenn Egon tanzt (promo single only)
 01/2000 Frei wie der Wind (promo single only)
 06/2000 Casanova
 11/2000 Barcarole Romantica (promo single only)
 05/2001 Die Insel der verlorenen Träume
 10/2001 Über alle 7 Meere
 02/2002 Santo Domingo, die Sterne und du
 06/2002 Südlich der Sehnsucht
 04/2003 Bolero d'Amore (promo single only)
 09/2003 Die Insel der verlorenen Träume (promo single only)
 02/2004 Die 10 Gebote der Liebe (promo single only)
 06/2004 Die Sonne von Capri (promo single only)
 09/2004 Unser Traum darf nicht sterben (promo single only)
 02/2005 Coconut und Calypso (promo single only)
 06/2005 Barfuß bis ans Ende der Welt (promo single only)
 11/2005 Träumer können fliegen (promo single only)
 03/2006 Liebe gibt und Liebe nimmt (promo single only)
 07/2006 Vino in Portofino (promo single only)
 01/2007 Tanz auf dem Vulkan (promo single only)
 05/2007 Fliegen bis zum Regenbogen (promo single only)
 09/2007 Tausend und ein Gefühl (promo single only)
 03/2008 Du bist mein tägliches Wunder (promo single only)
 08/2008 Der Rote Mond von Agadir (promo single only)
 11/2008 Das Märchen von Arcadia (promo single only)
 07/2009 Piroschka
 10/2010 Fremde Augen – Fremde Sterne
 01/2011 Ich geh durch die Hölle
 09/2011 Pretty Flamingo

References

German musical groups